Pali(y)ad is a town and former 7 guns salute princely state on Saurashtra peninsula in Gujarat, western India.

History 
The minor princely state in Jhalawar prant was ruled by Muslim rajput. It comprised the town and thirty four other villages and had a combined population of 10,970 in 1901, yielding a state revenue of 51,750 Rupees (1903-4, mostly from land) and paid a tribute of 1,200 Rupees, to the British.

Sources and external links 
History
 Imperial Gazetteer, on dsal.uchicago.edu

.

Princely states of Gujarat
Kathi princely states
Cities and towns in Bhavnagar district